Domagoj Pušić (born 24 October 1991) is a Croatian professional footballer who plays as a midfielder for Malaysia Super League side Terengganu.

Club career
Pušić started his career playing at youth level for his hometown club Osijek, with whom he signed a professional three-year contract in July 2008. He made his debut for the first team in the fifth round of 2008–09 Prva HNL season against NK Zagreb on 24 August 2008, when he replaced Ivan Miličević for the final ten minutes of the match. He scored his first goal in Prva HNL the following season in a 3–1 victory over Istra 1961.  On 15 January 2011, Pušić signed a two-and-a-half-year contract, extending his stay at Osijek until summer 2013.

In September 2013, Pušić signed a two-year contract with HNK Rijeka, with the possibility to extend the contract for another two years. In August 2014, he was loaned to NK Zadar until the end of the 2014–15 Prva HNL season. His contract with HNK Rijeka wasn't extended, and in June 2015 he became a free agent. On 1 October 2019, he became a member of Lithuanian side Sūduva, signing a contract lasting until the end of the 2020 season

n.

On 3 March 2021, Pušić signed a two-and-a-half-year contract with Bosnian Premier League club Zrinjski Mostar. He officially debuted for Zrinjski in a Bosnian Cup game against Sarajevo on 10 March 2021. Only three months after joining Zrinjski, Pušić left the club in June 2021. 

On 3 January 2023, Pušić has signed a one year contract deal with Malaysia Super League club Terengganu FC.

Honours
Rijeka
Croatian Cup: 2013–14
Croatian Super Cup: 2014

Sūduva
A Lyga: 2019

References

External links

Domagoj Pušić at Sportnet.hr 

1991 births
Living people
Sportspeople from Osijek
Association football midfielders
Croatian footballers
Croatia youth international footballers
NK Osijek players
HNK Rijeka players
NK Zadar players
FC Lugano players
FK Sūduva Marijampolė players
HŠK Zrinjski Mostar players
HNK Cibalia players
NK BSK Bijelo Brdo players
Croatian Football League players
Swiss Super League players
A Lyga players
Premier League of Bosnia and Herzegovina players
First Football League (Croatia) players
Croatian expatriate footballers
Expatriate footballers in Switzerland
Croatian expatriate sportspeople in Switzerland
Expatriate footballers in Lithuania
Croatian expatriate sportspeople in Lithuania
Expatriate footballers in Bosnia and Herzegovina
Croatian expatriate sportspeople in Bosnia and Herzegovina